Matt Maiocco (born January 26, 1967) is an American sportswriter best known for his work as the beat reporter of the San Francisco 49ers for the Santa Rosa Press Democrat. He currently serves as the San Francisco 49ers beat reporter for NBC Sports Bay Area.

Biography
Maiocco attended Humboldt State University in Arcata, California from 1988 to 1990 and graduated in 1990 with a degree in journalism. Born in Corning, California, Maiocco lives in the Bay Area with his wife, Sarah, and their daughters, Jane and Lucy.

Maiocco has covered the San Francisco 49ers on a daily basis for more than two decades. He writes regular stories about the team and also provides constant updates through his "Instant 49er's" blog, his Facebook page and even Twitter.  Maiocco is featured numerous times weekly on 95.7 The Game as the 49ers Insider, and can be seen on ESPN where he has been added as a regular contributor to the "First Take" show.

Career

 1988-1990: Sports reporter at The Eureka Times-Standard
 1993 - 1995: Sports editor at The Argus (Fremont, Calif.)
 1995 - 1997: 49ers beat reporter at the Oakland Tribune (Alameda Newspaper Group)
 1997 - 1999: 49ers beat reporter at the Contra Costa Times
 1999–2010: 49ers beat reporter at the Santa Rosa Press Democrat
 2010 – Present: 49ers beat reporter at NBC Sports Bay Area

Awards
Maiocco is a three-time Pro Football Writers of America award winner for game stories and features.

In 2007 his Instant 49ers blog was ranked as the No. 2 NFL team blog in the country by Rotoworld.

Published books
 Roger Craig's Tales from the San Francisco 49ers Sideline (Roger Craig with Matt Maiocco), (Sports Publishing, 2004) 
 San Francisco 49ers: Where Have You Gone?: Joe Montana, Y. A. Tittle, Steve Young, and Other 49ers Greats (Sports Publishing, 2005) 
 Second edition with David Fucillo (Sports Publishing, 2011) 
 San Francisco 49ers: The Complete Illustrated History (MVP Books, 2013) 
 Letters to 87: Fans Remember the Legacy of Dwight Clark (Cameron Books, 2019)

References

External links
 
 Matt Maiocco at NBC Sports Bay Area

1967 births
Sportswriters from California
Living people
California State Polytechnic University, Humboldt alumni